Mandiana is a prefecture located in the Kankan Region of Guinea. The capital is Mandiana. The prefecture covers an area of 12,825 km.² and has a population of 335,999.

Sub-prefectures
The prefecture is divided administratively into 12 sub-prefectures:
 Mandiana-Centre
 Balandougouba
 Dialakoro
 Faralako
 Kantoumania
 Kiniéran
 Koundian
 Koundianakoro
 Morodou
 Niantania
 Saladou
 Sansando

See also
Fodekaria

Prefectures of Guinea
Kankan Region